Kenneth C. Haycraft (February 16, 1907 – June 29, 1995) was an American football player in the National Football League (NFL).

Biography
Haycraft was born on February 16, 1907, in Bemidji, Minnesota.

Career
Haycraft played with the Minneapolis Red Jackets during the 1929 NFL season before splitting the following season with the Red Jackets and the Green Bay Packers. As such, he was a member of the 1930 NFL Champion Packers.

He played at the collegiate level at the University of Minnesota.

See also
 List of Green Bay Packers players

References

External links
   

1907 births
1995 deaths
American football ends
Green Bay Packers players
Minneapolis Red Jackets players
Minnesota Golden Gophers football players
People from Bemidji, Minnesota
Players of American football from Minneapolis